This is a list of video games for the Nintendo DS video game console that have sold or shipped at least one million copies. The best-selling game on the Nintendo DS is New Super Mario Bros. First released in North America on May 15, 2006, it went on to sell nearly 31 million units worldwide.

There are a total of 73 Nintendo DS games on this list which are confirmed to have sold or shipped at least one million units. Of these, 18 were developed by internal Nintendo development divisions. Of the 73 games on this list, 50 were published in one or more regions by Nintendo.

By September 30, 2022, over 948.76million total copies of games had been sold for the Nintendo DS. As of March 31, 2019, there are a total of 139 Nintendo DS games that have sold at least one million units.

List

Notes

References

External links
 Nintendo IR Information - Nintendo DS Software

 
Nintendo DS
Best-selling Nintendo DS video games